JSC "Aircompany Grozny Avia" (ОАО "Авиакомпания Грозный Авиа"), operating as Grozny Avia, was a Russian airline with its head office at Grozny Airport in Grozny, Russia. Its main base is Grozny Airport.

History
The airline was formed on 17 August 2007 by Ramzan Kadyrov regional public fund on the order of the President of Chechnya. In 2014, a deal to acquire two Sukhoi Superjet 100 aircraft fell through due to cost.

Fleet

The Groznyyavia fleet included the following aircraft as of 7 November 2012:

References

External links

Official website 

Defunct airlines of Russia
Airlines established in 2007
Airlines disestablished in 2016
Companies based in Grozny
Russian companies established in 2007